The 2004 South Sydney Rabbitohs season was the 95th in the club's history. Coached by Arthur Kitinas and Paul Langmack and captained by Bryan Fletcher and Ashley Harrison, they competed in the National Rugby League's 2004 Telstra Premiership, finishing the regular season 15th out of 15 teams, failing to reach the finals.

Season Summary

Milestones

Player Movements

Gains
Dean Byrne from  St George Illawarra Dragons
Glenn Hall from  Canterbury-Bankstown Bulldogs
Scott Logan from  Hull F.C.
Adam MacDougall from  Newcastle Knights
Willie Manu from  Wests Tigers
Shane Marteene from  Canterbury-Bankstown Bulldogs
Todd Polglase from  Canterbury-Bankstown Bulldogs
Steve Skinnon from  Sydney Roosters
David Thompson from  North Queensland Cowboys

Source:

Losses
Jamie Fitzgerald to  Newcastle Knights
Andrew Hart to  London Broncos
Wise Kativerata to  Parramatta Eels
Wade McKinnon to  Parramatta Eels
Duncan MacGillivray to  Wakefield Trinity
Nathan Merritt to  Cronulla Sutherland Sharks
Willie Peters to  Widnes Vikings
Frank Puletua to  Penrith Panthers
Russell Richardson to  Newcastle Knights
Chris Walker to  Sydney Roosters

Source:

Ladder

Fixtures

Regular season

References

South Sydney Rabbitohs seasons
South Sydney Rabbitohs season